Sir James Nursaw, KCB, KC (born 18 October 1932) is a retired British lawyer and public servant.

Born in 1932, Nursaw attended Christ's College, Cambridge, graduating with a Bachelor of Arts degree in 1953 and a Bachelor of Laws degree in 1954. He was called to the bar in 1955, and after a year as a senior research officer at Cambridge's Department of Criminal Science, he joined the Legal Advisory at the Home Office in 1959. After serving as Legal Adviser to the Law Officers' Department (1980–83) and then the Home Office and Northern Ireland Office (1983–88), he was appointed HM Procurator General and Treasury Solicitor, serving between 1988 and retirement in 1992.

Nursaw was appointed a Companion of the Order of the Bath in 1983, and he was promoted to Knight Commander in 1992. He took silk in 1988.

References 

1932 births
Members of the Middle Temple
Alumni of Christ's College, Cambridge
Knights Commander of the Order of the Bath
English King's Counsel
Living people
Treasury Solicitors